1578 Kirkwood, provisional designation , is a Hilda asteroid from the outermost regions of the asteroid belt, approximately 52 kilometers in diameter. It was discovered on 10 January 1951, by astronomers of the Indiana Asteroid Program at Goethe Link Observatory in Indiana, United States. The asteroid was named after American astronomer Daniel Kirkwood.

Orbit and classification 

Kirkwood belongs to the orbital Hilda group, which is located outermost part of the main belt. Asteroids in this dynamical group have semi-major axis between 3.7 and 4.2 AU and stay in a 3:2 resonance with the gas giant Jupiter. Kirkwood, however, is a background asteroid and not a member of the (collisional) Hilda family.

It orbits the Sun at a distance of 3.0–4.9 AU once every 7 years and 9 months (2,839 days). Its orbit has an eccentricity of 0.24 and an inclination of 1° with respect to the ecliptic.

Physical characteristics 

In the Tholen classification, Kirkwood is a dark D-type asteroid. It is also characterized as a D-type by PanSTARRS photometric survey.

Rotation period 

In October 2012, a rotational lightcurve of Kirkwood was obtained from photometric observations at the Etscorn Campus Observatory in New Mexico, United States. Lightcurve analysis gave a rotation period of 12.518 hours with a brightness variation of 0.05 magnitude. Another lightcurve gave a period of 17.9 hours and an amplitude of 0.22 magnitude.

Diameter and albedo 

According to the surveys carried out by the Japanese Akari satellite, the NEOWISE mission of NASA's Wide-field Infrared Survey Explorer and the Infrared Astronomical Satellite IRAS, Kirkwood measures between 47.077 and 57.14 kilometers in diameter and its surface has an albedo between 0.044 and 0.063.

The Collaborative Asteroid Lightcurve Link adopts the results obtained by IRAS, that is, an albedo of 0.0517 and a diameter of 51.88 kilometers based on an absolute magnitude of 10.26.

Naming 

This minor planet was named in memory of American astronomer Daniel Kirkwood (1814–1895), long-time professor of mathematics at Indiana University. He discovered the Kirkwood gaps, which are gaps in the distribution of the mean distances of the minor planets in the asteroid belt. Kirkwood was the Indiana Asteroid Program's first numbered discovery. The official  was published by the Minor Planet Center in March 1952. The lunar crater Kirkwood was also named in the astronomer's honor.

Notes

References

External links 
 Asteroid (1578) Kirkwood at RASC
 Asteroid Lightcurve Database (LCDB), query form (info )
 Dictionary of Minor Planet Names, Google books
 Asteroids and comets rotation curves, CdR – Observatoire de Genève, Raoul Behrend
 Discovery Circumstances: Numbered Minor Planets (1)-(5000) – Minor Planet Center
 
 

001578
001578
Named minor planets
001578
19510110